Redvern Esmond Edmunds (born 10 January 1943) is a Welsh former professional footballer.

Edmunds played six times for Portsmouth in the 1960–61 season. In 1961 he transferred to Newport County where he played four matches in the 1961–62 season.

References

Welsh footballers
Portsmouth F.C. players
Newport County A.F.C. players
Merthyr Tydfil F.C. players
Abergavenny Thursdays F.C. players
English Football League players
1943 births
Footballers from Newport, Wales
Living people
Association football wingers